Aaron Parchem (born June 6, 1977) is an American former pair skater. He competed at the 2006 Winter Olympics with partner Marcy Hinzmann.

Personal life 
Aaron Parchem was born June 6, 1977, in Columbus, Ohio. He was adopted by Al and Georga Parchem from the Chicago area and was raised with an adopted sister. In spring 2003, he graduated from the University of Detroit Mercy with an undergraduate degree in economics. As of November 2017, he is a senior financial consultant at Comerica Securities Inc.

Parchem married Polish single skater Zuzanna Szwed in Chicago in 2004. They have a daughter, Sofie (born  2011).

Career 
After trying pairs at age 19, Parchem switched to the discipline a year later. He initially skated with Shawna Winter.

Coaches at the Detroit Skating Club paired him with Stephanie Kalesavich in March 1999. The pair won the 2000 Golden Spin of Zagreb and took bronze at the 2001 Nebelhorn Trophy. They competed at one ISU Championship, the 2002 Four Continents, where they placed fifth.

In April 2003, Parchem teamed up with Marcy Hinzmann. She tore the anterior cruciate ligament in her left knee during a practice in August 2004 and skated with the injury during the season. She underwent surgery following the U.S. Championships in January 2005 and was off the ice for four months.

In 2005, the pair won the bronze medal at the U.S. Figure Skating Championships. In 2006 they won the silver medal at the U.S. Figure Skating Championships and represented the United States at the 2006 Winter Olympics in Torino, Italy.

Programs

With Hinzmann

With Kalesavich

Results

With Hinzmann

With Kalesavich

With Winter

References

External links 
 
 
  U.S. Olympic Team bio

American male pair skaters
Figure skaters at the 2006 Winter Olympics
Living people
1977 births
Olympic figure skaters of the United States
Sportspeople from Columbus, Ohio
Competitors at the 2001 Goodwill Games
20th-century American people
21st-century American people